Yengejeh (also known as Engīja, Yengejeh Dezmar, and Yengidzha) is a village in Jushin Rural District, Kharvana District, Varzaqan County, East Azerbaijan Province, Iran. At the 2006 census, its population was 539, in 122 families.

References 

Towns and villages in Varzaqan County